Frenchtown is an unincorporated community immediately north of Perryville in Cecil County, Maryland, United States.

References

Unincorporated communities in Cecil County, Maryland
Unincorporated communities in Maryland